James P. Blair (born April 14, 1931, Philadelphia ) is an American photographer. His work has been published in National Geographic Magazine  and elsewhere.

James P. Blair prepared for a photographic future by studying with Harry Callahan and Aaron Siskind at the Institute of Design at the Illinois Institute of Technology in Chicago. Following graduation, he photographed at the Pittsburgh Photographic Library for Roy E. Stryker, the director of the Farm Security Administration’s photographic-documentation project of the 1930s. For two years, he served as a Lieutenant (j.g) in the U.S. Navy, spending part of that time assisting refugees from North Vietnam.

Upon his return in 1958, he joined WIIC-TV, an NBC station in Pittsburgh, as a reporter and film photographer. As a freelance photographer, Blair also had commissions from the U.S. Information Agency, Time, Life, and National Geographic magazines. He put together a one-person show at the Carnegie Museum of Art in Pittsburgh and co-authored the book Listen With The Eye with poet Samuel Hazo.

Success with the National Geographic assignments brought him to the staff in 1962, where he happily spent over thirty years; by 1994 he had accumulated 46 articles and over 2,000 pictures. His coverage took him to Yugoslavia, Czechoslovakia, Ethiopia, West Africa, Iran, Greece and across the United States. He covered agriculture, coal, astronomy, and the uses of photography in science, among other subjects. In 1983 he photographed Our Threatened Inheritance, the National Geographic Society’s benchmark book on the U.S. federal lands. His final article for the Magazine, published in 1994, dealt with the first foreign sailing voyage down the Volga River in Russia.

In 1977, Blair received the Overseas Press Club of America Award for Best Photographic Reporting from Abroad for his 1976 coverage of South Africa. Over the years, he has received numerous awards from the National Press Photographers Association and the White House News Photographers Association.

There have been one-person shows of his work in Iran, St. Louis, Pittsburgh, and Washington D.C.; he has been included in group shows in Atlanta and Washington. His photographs are represented in the permanent collections of the National Portrait Gallery (Washington DC), the Museum of Modern Art (New York City), the Portland Museum of Art (Maine), and the Carnegie Museum of Art (Pittsburgh). The 1988 centennial National Geographic exhibit Odyssey included several of his photographs.

Since retiring from the National Geographic Society in 1994, Blair has continued photographing and teaching. He has had Geo, Vermont Life, and Wooden Boat magazine assignments. Taunton Press published his book Wooden Fences in 1997. His photography is featured in National Geographic’s best selling book The Geography of Religion: Where God Lives, Where Pilgrims Walk, published in 2004. He is a National Fellow of the Explorers Club and since 1998 a member of the Cosmos Club in Washington DC.

James P. Blair is now represented by Edgewater Gallery in Middlebury, Vermont.

References

External links 
 Carnegie Library of Pittsburgh

1931 births
Living people
American photographers
Fellows of the Explorers Club